Ravi Raj (born Jamshedpur, Jharkhand) is a well-known television and film director and producer in India. He started his production house "Ravi Raj Creations" in 2017 & launched Agniphera, Ankit Gera, Yukti Kapoor Simran Kaur, are going to play leads in the show, he has Directed many TV shows include Swaragini and Woh Rehne Waali Mahlon Ki.

Director

Television
Swaragini- Colors TV
Bhabhi- STAR Plus ( 500 episodes)
Devi SONY Entertainment Television ( 104 episodes)
Yeh Meri Life Hai - SONY Entertainment Television(200 episodes)
Ek Ladki Anjani Si SONY Entertainment Television( 200 episodes)
Miilee- Star TV.( 110 episodes)
Woh Rehne Wali Mahlon ki - SAHARA ONE ( 600 episodes)
Grishasti- STAR Plus(105 Episodes)
Aise Karo Naa Vidaa - Colors TV.(90 episodes)
Sabki Laadli Bebo - STAR Plus.(200 episodes)
Beend Banoongaa Ghodi Chadhunga -Imagine TV .(150 episodes)
Phir Subah Hogi Zee TV.( 90 episodes)
Punar Vivah - Ek Nayi Umeed- Zee TV.(90 episodes)
Anamika  - SONY Entertainment Television (110 episodes)
Dil Ki Nazar Se Khoobsurat -SONY Entertainment Television (50 Episodes)
Kaisa Yeh Ishq Hai... Ajab Sa Risk Hai -Life OK(240 Episodes)

Producer

Television
Agniphera - &TV
Laal Ishq  - &TV
Mauka-E-Vardaat - &TV

References

Indian television producers
Living people
Year of birth missing (living people)
People from Jamshedpur